Roman Pichler was an Italian luger who competed during the 1960s. He won with Karl Prinoth the gold medal in the men's doubles event at the 1961 FIL World Luge Championships in Girenbad, Switzerland.

References

Italian lugers
Italian male lugers
Possibly living people
Year of birth missing
Sportspeople from Südtirol